Barkam is a town in and the seat of Barkam City, in the northwest of Sichuan province, People's Republic of China.

Climate 
Due to its elevation, Barkam lies in the transition between a subtropical highland climate (Köppen Cwb) and humid continental climate (Köppen Dwb), with strong monsoonal influences; winters are frosty and summers warm with frequent rain. Nearly two-thirds of the annual precipitation of  occurs from June to September. With monthly percent possible sunshine ranging from 36% in June to 65% in December, the town receives 2,133 hours of bright sunshine annually. Diurnal temperature variation is large, averaging  annually.

References

Towns in Sichuan
Ngawa Tibetan and Qiang Autonomous Prefecture